David Crowley (March 25, 1937 – January 16, 2011) was a politician from Cincinnati, Ohio who served on the Cincinnati City Council and as Vice-Mayor of the city. Crowley was elected in his first political candidacy in 2001 and was re-elected in 2003.  In 2001, he came in seventh place; and in 2003, he finished ninth. (The top nine vote-getters win a seat on council.)  In the 2005 city council election, Crowley finished fourth out of 32 candidates, retaining his seat.

Before winning the seat on Cincinnati City Council, Crowley had a career in management of agencies and programs providing social services, community action and capacity building in both domestic and international settings. He received a master's degree in social work from Ohio State University and a master's degree in international affairs from George Washington University. He served as executive of a national association representing the elderly.

From 1983 to 1995, Crowley directed international relief and development projects in West Africa, Nepal, Thailand, Romania, Croatia, and Bosnia. He also served as a manager in US Peace Corps in the Caribbean and Cameroon.

Death
Crowley died of cancer on January 16, 2011, in Cincinnati, aged 73. Formerly married to Kay Gilmore, he remarried, to Sherri Huss, who survived him, as did his five children: Kevin, David, Dennis, Ann and Erin.

References

Cincinnati City Council members
Ohio Democrats
Elliott School of International Affairs alumni
Deaths from cancer in Ohio
2011 deaths
1937 births
Ohio State University alumni